Uchkurgan may refer to:
 Uchqoʻrgʻon, city in Uzbekistan
 Üch-Korgon, village in Kyrgyzstan